Gloor is a family name which may refer to:

 Cyrill Gloor (born 1982), Swiss footballer
 Danny Gloor (born 1952), Canadian former ice hockey player
 Kurt Gloor (1942–1997), Swiss film director, screenwriter and producer
 Mike Gloor (born 1950), American politician
 René Gloor (born 1956), Swiss retired long jumper